Velika also known as Spitaki (Σπιτάκι), is a beach village of Melivoia municipal unit, Larissa regional unit, Greece.

Velika is a beautiful seaside village, which attracts many people in the summer and claims a dynamic characterization of a modern tourist resort. Numerous cultural and sporting events take place during the summer.

References
Παραλία Βελίκας

Populated places in Larissa (regional unit)